Life Is Beautiful is a 2000 Indian Malayalam-language drama film written, directed and produced by Fazil. The film stars Mohanlal and Samyuktha Varma in lead roles, and features a soundtrack composed by Ouseppachan. The film was released on 14 April 2000, and is partly a remake of the classic "Dead Poets Society", but titled was inspired by the 1997 Italian film  of the same title Life is Beautiful.

Plot
Vinayachandran and Sindhu are a happily married couple who enjoy romancing. Vinayachandran joins a public school as a Plus Two teacher. In the strict disciplined school, unlike other teachers, Vinayachandran is friendly and conducts enjoyable classes. The students gets easily carried away by his amiable nature.

One day, Sindhu's sister Bala visits them and asks Sindhu's permission for leaving to the United States for her higher studies, which Sindhu disapproves bluntly. Later, Sindhu leaves for a professional tour, leaving Vinayachandran and Bala alone. Meanwhile, Bala tries to get intimate with Vinayachandran which annoys him and he asks her why she is behaving so childishly for which she replies that Sindhu was the only one she had in this world but now as she has married Vinayachandran, she is all alone. Vinayachandran understands her state of mind consoles her and asks her to behave like his sister. As the story progresses, much to Vinayachandran's dismay, Bala's behaviour gets more strange day by day.

Vinayachandran also loses his job because of his in-academic style of teaching. Sindhu after her trip returns and Bala confesses that she tried to get intimate with Vinayachandran and hence intended to replace Sindhu. Sindhu is devastated by this revelation and stops talking to Vinayachandran. Vinayachandran gets his job back as his students stood up for him and asks the authority not to fire him. Sindhu agrees for Bala's US plans. Vinayachandran joins them at the railway station and together the couple bids good bye for Bala.

The film ends with Sindhu repeating Vinayachandran's words to him that whatever happens in LIFE it IS always BEAUTIFUL.

Cast
 Mohanlal as Vinayachandran
 Samyuktha Varma as Sindhu, Vinayachandran's wife
 Geetu Mohandas as Bala, Sindhu's younger sister
 Arun as Sooraj Kishore
 Innocent as Nambiar
 K. P. A. C. Lalitha as Sosamma
 Nedumudi Venu as Principal
 Reena
 Rizabawa as Sindhu's Manager
 Sai Kumar as Suraj's father
 Saritha as Vice Principal
Mithun Ramesh as Rajan Panicker

Soundtrack

The film features an eight-song soundtrack composed by Ouseppachan, all songs' lyrics were written by Kaithapram Damodaran Namboothiri. The music label T-Series released the soundtrack on 1 January 2012.

Production
The film marked the return of Geethu Mohandas, it was her first adult role after appearing in films as a child artist early in her life.

Legacy
On 5 September 2015 on the occasion of Teachers' Day in India, International Business Times included Mohanlal's Vinayachandran in their compilation of seven "Best Teachers in Malayalam Films That You Will Never Forget".

References

External links

2000 films
2000s Malayalam-language films
Films scored by Ouseppachan